Mathias Fischer may refer to:
 Mathias Fischer (basketball)
 Mathias Fischer (footballer)